Rhapsomates (or Rapsomates) was a Byzantine official who led a revolt on Cyprus in the early 1090s. He was defeated by the megas doux John Doukas and taken captive. The main narrative sources for his revolt are Anna Komnene and John Zonaras.

Background
Rhapsomates is the name of an obscure family. The given name of the rebel leader is not known. A Basil Rhapsomates is known from a seal dated to the 12th century. It is just possible that this Basil was the same person as the rebel leader. There was an ergasterion (workshop) belonging to a John Rhapsomates located in Galata, the Genoese quarter of Constantinople, in the 12th century.

Rhapsomates held office on Cyprus before the revolt, but which office is unknown. It does not appear to have been a military one, since he is described as having never held a sword or rode a horse. He was most probably a judge (krites) or kourator (imperial estate manager). It is possible, but unlikely, that he was the catepan (military governor) of Cyprus. The absence of a catepan in the surviving narratives of the revolt is difficult to explain, but the office may have been temporarily vacant or the catepan may have been an early victim of the revolt.

Revolt and suppression
Rhapsomates' revolt was contemporary with that of Karykes on Crete. Michael Glykas even confuses them. It broke out in late 1090 or early 1091. In February or March 1091, John the Oxite delivered a scathing rebuke to the Emperor Alexios I Komnenos, during which he noted the outbreak of revolts in Crete and Cyprus. Both took place while the central government was occupied in wars with the Pechenegs in Europe and the Turks of Emir Tzachas in Asia. 

Although the mere arrival of the fleet of John Doukas off Crete caused the revolt of Karykes to melt away, the megas doux faced much greater resistance on Cyprus. The island's military establishment supported Rhapsomates, including all or a large part of the tagma of the Immortals stationed there. Doukas was forced to land his troops and fight a protracted campaign. Manuel Boutoumites was among Doukas' generals. The campaign began in the spring of 1093, but Anna Komnene does not record how long the resistance lasted before Rhapsomates was captured.

Aftermath
In the aftermath of the revolt, Alexios I appointed Eumathios Philokales as governor with the title of stratopedarches and sent a large garrison. He also endowed him with special taxing powers, a hint perhaps that the revolt had been directed at Alexios' fiscal policies. He also appointed a certain Kalliparios to fiscal (exisotes) and judicial (krites) office. A flurry of construction on the island in the 1090s may be linked to the crushing of Rhapsomates' revolt.

Notes

Bibliography

Byzantine Cyprus
Byzantine rebels
1090s in the Byzantine Empire
Alexios I Komnenos
11th-century Byzantine people